Northern Colorado Bears baseball is the varsity intercollegiate team representing University of Northern Colorado in the sport of college baseball in NCAA Division I. The team is led by Mike Anderson, and plays its home games at Jackson Field on campus in Greeley, Colorado. The Bears are baseball members of the Summit League, having joined in July 2021 after spending the previous eight years as baseball members of the Western Athletic Conference.

Prior to the 1968 establishment of what is now the NCAA Division II baseball tournament, the Bears reached the College World Series nine times, and reached the CWS again in 1974 at the Division I level for a total of ten appearances, compiling a record of 3–20. The school was known as Colorado State College until 1970, when the school changed to its present name. This is not to be confused with the current Colorado State University, which was known as Colorado A&M until 1957.

Venue

The Bears play baseball home games at Jackson Field, which holds 1,500. Jackson Field has hosted NCAA regionals in 1952, 1955, 1957, 1959, 1962 and 1974.

History
Northern Colorado first fielded a baseball team from 1924 to 1942, taking a break during World War II and returned to play in 1945, under Pete Butler, who returned to his post as head coach after serving in the United States Navy.

After playing as a Division I Independent following their return to Division I play in 2004, the Bears joined the Great West Conference for the 2010 season. The Bears captured the 2013 regular season Great West Conference championship, their first conference championship since 1998. When the Great West League became defunct, the Bears joined the Western Athletic Conference (WAC).

Following the 2021 season, the Bears announced they would join the Summit League to help control costs.

Head coaches
Records are through June 28, 2022

Postseason appearances

NCAA tournament

Source:

Conference affiliations
Rocky Mountain Conference: 1924–1972
Great Plains Athletic Conference: 1973–1976
Division I Independent: 1977–1990
North Central Conference 1991–2003
Division I Independent: 2004–2009
Great West Conference: 2010–2013
Western Athletic Conference: 2014–2021
Summit League: 2022–present

Source:

Awards and honors

All-Americans

Freshman All-Americans

Conference player of the year

Conference coach of the year

References